Sunset is a mid-19th-century drawing by Eugène Delacroix. Done in oil pastel on lined paper, the work depicts a sunset.

Description
While Delacroix was widely noted for his figure-centric romanticist paintings, the French artist produced a number of expressive works during his later years. Among these works is Sunset, done by Delacroix circa 1850. The drawing depicts a sunset, set behind and above a gently sloping landscape. The sunset is partially blocked by two cloud formations, one directly above the Earth and a second, thicker band along the top of the painting. Despite these obstructions, the rays of sunlight are visibly breaking through, leading some to compare the painting to Delcroix's earlier work on the Galerie d'Apollon.

References

Drawings of the Metropolitan Museum of Art